Edward Edwin Fitzgibbon (June 6, 1844 – June 30, 1909) was a farmer, teacher, and politician.

Born in Staten Island, New York, Fitzgibbon moved to Wisconsin and settled in the town of Westport, Dane County, Wisconsin. Fitzgibbon was a teacher and farmer. Fitzgibbon served as superintendent of schools and as Westport Town Clerk. In 1885, Fitzgibbon served in the Wisconsin State Assembly and was a Democrat. He lived in Waunakee, Wisconsin. Fitzgibbon lived in Arizona for three years and then returned to Dane County, Wisconsin, where he died of a heart ailment.

Notes

References

1844 births
1909 deaths
People from Staten Island
People from Dane County, Wisconsin
Educators from Wisconsin
Farmers from Wisconsin
Democratic Party members of the Wisconsin State Assembly
People from Waunakee, Wisconsin
Educators from New York City
19th-century American politicians
19th-century American educators